Barry or Berry is both a given name and a surname. The given name can be an Anglicised form of some Irish personal names or shortened form of Barrington, while the surname has numerous etymological origins, and is derived from both place names and personal names.

Etymology

Of given name
The given name Barry is derived from Gaelic, possibly being an Anglicised form of the personal name Báire, which is a short form of the related Irish names Bairrfhionn or  Barrfind ("fair-headed", "fair-haired"), and Finbar or Fionnbharr ("fair-topped", "fair-haired").

For example, Barry is sometimes derived from the Irish Bairre, Barra, and Barre, which are in turn forms of the name Barrfind. Furthermore, Barry is sometimes an Anglicised form of the Irish Finnbarr, which also has short forms of Bairre, Barra, and Barre. Similarly, Barry is sometimes an Anglicised form of the latter short form Barra. In other cases, Barry is an Anglicised form of the Irish Berach ("pointed", "spear", "sharp").

Since the twentieth century, the name has become very popular in Australia. A variant form of the given name is Barrie. In the Netherlands the form Berry is also used. Pet forms of the name are Baz and Bazza.

Barry may also be a hypocorism for Bartholomew.

As a given name, Barry  is currently less common than it once was. It rose in popularity during the 1930s and 1940s, and was in the top 100 names through the 1970s. In recent years, the name has not even made the top 1000 list of names (the last time was in 2004, where it ranked 963). Barry's highest rank was 61, which was achieved in 1962.

US President Barack Obama was called by the nickname Barry when younger, which he eventually halted.

Barry as a given name may also be from the surname, as with Barry Yelverton, 1st Viscount Avonmore, whose mother's maiden name was Barry.

Of surname
The surname Barry has numerous origins.

In some cases the surname Barry is an Anglicised form of the Irish Ó Beargha, meaning "descendant of Beargh". The byname Beargh means "plunderer" or "spear-like". In other cases Barry is an Anglicisation of the Irish Ó Báire, meaning "descendant of Báire". Alternatively, Barry is a patronymic form of the personal name Henry. In such cases, the name is partly derived from the Welsh ap Harry, as is the case of the similar surname  Parry. In other cases, the surname Barry is derived from a place name, sometimes seemingly of  Continental origin, and sometimes from a British place name, such as Barry, Angus in Scotland.

The surname Barry, when originating in Ireland, is chiefly derived from the Cambro-Norman family of de Barry (from Barry, Vale of Glamorgan), who were prominent in the 12th-century Norman invasion of Ireland. In Irish, this family's name is rendered de Barra. In Ireland, the surname Barry occurs most commonly in Munster and south Leinster. The concentrations of the surname in County Limerick could correspond with the Ó Beargha origin of the name, while the concentration of the surname in West Cork could correspond with the Ó Báire origin.

There is a surname Barry, variant form of the rarer Barri, typical of the south of France, that means "rampart, city wall" and by extension "suburb", that is to say "somebody from the suburb or living near the rampart". Variant forms include Delbarry and Dubarry.

Barry is also a common surname given among the Fula people in West Africa.

Geographical distribution
As of 2014, 59.3% of all known bearers of the surname Barry were residents of Guinea (frequency 1:17), 14.7% of Burkina Faso (1:104), 5.4% of the United States (1:5,629), 4.5% of Senegal (1:274), 3.7% of Mali (1:384), 1.2% of England (1:3,951), 1.1% of Ireland (1:362) and 1.0% of Australia (1:2,004).

People with the surname 

 A. Constantine Barry (1815–1888), American educator and politician
 Alice Mary Barry (1880–1955), Irish doctor
 Alfred Barry (1826–1910), Anglican Bishop of Sydney; second son of Charles Barry
 Angela Barry, Bermudian writer and educator
 Ann Street Barry (1734–1801), English actress; second wife of Spranger Barry
 Bonny Barry (born 1960), Australian politician
 Brent Barry (born 1971), American sports commentator and basketball player; third son of Rick Barry
 Brian Barry (1936–2009), British philosopher
 Canyon Barry (born 1994), American basketball player; youngest son of Rick Barry
 Charles Barry (1795–1860), English architect, main designer of the Palace of Westminster
 Charles Barry Jr. (1823–1900), English architect; eldest son of Charles Barry
 Christian Barry, American philosopher
 Christopher Barry (born 1925), British television director
 Claudja Barry (born 1952), Jamaican-Canadian singer and actress
 B. Constance Barry, American actor
 Damion Barry (born 1982), Trinidadian sprinter
 Daniel Barry (disambiguation)
 Dave Barry (born 1947), American author and columnist, winner of the Pulitzer Prize
 David Barry (disambiguation)
 David de Barry, 5th Viscount Barry (–1617), Irish peer
 Dede Barry (born 1972), American cyclist
 Denis Barry (1929–2003), president of the United States Chess Federation (1993–96)
 Denny Barry (1883–1923), Irish Republican, died during the 1923 Irish hunger strikes
 Dick Barry (1926–2013), American politician and lawyer
 Donald T. Barry (1928–2017), American politician
 Don "Red" Barry (1912–1980), American film actor
 Drew Barry (born 1973), American retired basketball player; fourth son of Rick Barry
 Edward B. Barry (1849-1939), American rear admiral
 Edward Middleton Barry (1830–80), English architect; third son of Charles Barry
 Elizabeth Barry (1658–1713), English actress
 Fred Barry (born 1948), American football player in the National Football League
 Frederick G. Barry (1845–1909), member of the U.S. House of Representatives
 Gareth Barry (born 1981), English footballer
 Garret Barry (disambiguation)
 Gene Barry (1919–2009), American stage, screen and television actor
 Gerald Barry (disambiguation)
 Glenn Barry, American musician, bass player in the symphonic metal band Kamelot
 Grant Barry, American musician
 Hilary Barry (born 1969), New Zealand television personality
 Jack Barry (disambiguation)
 James Barry (disambiguation)
 James de Barry, 4th Viscount Buttevant (1520–81), Irish peer
 Jason Barry-Smith (born 1969), Australian operatic baritone, vocal coach, composer and arranger
 Jeff Barry (born 1938), American pop music songwriter, singer and record producer
 Jeff Barry (baseball) (born 1968), was a Major League Baseball player
 J. Esmonde Barry (1923–2007), Canadian healthcare activist and political commentator
 Joan Barry (disambiguation)
 Joe Barry (disambiguation), several people
 John Barry (disambiguation)
 John Wolfe Barry (1836–1918), English civil engineer, co-designer of Tower Bridge; youngest son of Charles Barry
 Jon Barry (born 1969), American television analyst and basketball player; second son of Rick Barry
 Jonathan Barry (born 1988), Bahamian cricketer
 Jonathan B. Barry (born 1945), American Democratic politician, businessman, and farmer
 Joseph Barry (born 1940), American real estate developer 
 Joyce Barry (1919–1999), Australian cyclist
 Kate Barry (1752–1823), heroine of the American Revolutionary War
 Keane Barry (born 2002), Irish darts player
 Keith Barry (born 1976), Irish illusionist, mentalist and close-up magician
 Kevin Barry (1902–20), Irish Republican Army member
 Kevin Barry (boxer) (born 1959), New Zealand boxer, boxing trainer and manager
 Krystal Barry, American beauty queen
 Kyra Tirana Barry (born 1966), Team Leader for United States Women's National wrestling team
 Len Barry (1942–2020), American singer, songwriter and record producer
 Leo Barry (born 1977), Australian rules footballer
 Liam Barry (born 1971), New Zealand rugby union player
 Luís Barry (born 1982), Portuguese football player known simply as Barry
 Lyall Barry, New Zealand swimmer
 Lynda Barry (born 1956), American cartoonist, author, and teacher
 Lynn Norenberg Barry (born 1959), American basketball player and administrator; current wife of Rick Barry and mother of Canyon Barry
 Madame du Barry (1743–1793), French courtier
 Mamadou Barry, Guinean footballer
 Margaret Stuart Barry (born 1927), English writer
 Marion Barry (1936–2014), American politician
 Martin Barry (1802–1855), British physician and embryologist
 Marty Barry (1905–1969), Canadian ice hockey player
 Mary Barry, Canadian musician
 Maryanne Trump Barry (born 1937), American attorney
 Max Barry (born 1973), Australian author
 Michael Barry (disambiguation)
 Morris Barry (1918–2000), English TV producer
 Norman Barry (1897–1988), American judge, politician, and football coach
 Norman P. Barry (1944–2008), English philosopher
 Odell Barry (1941-2022), American football player
 Pat Barry (kickboxer) (born 1979), American kickboxer and retired mixed martial artist
 Patricia Barry (1922–2016), American actress
 Patrick Barry (disambiguation)
 Paul Barry (disambiguation), several people
 Peter Barry (politician) (1928–2016), Irish Fine Gael politician and businessman
 Philip Barry (1896–1949), American dramatist
 Rahmane Barry (born 1986), Senegalese footballer
 Ralph Andrews Barry (1883–1939), philatelic writer
 Raymond J. Barry (born 1937), American actor
 Redmond Barry (1813–1880), Anglo-Irish-Australian judge
 Richard Barry (disambiguation)
 Rick Barry (born 1944), American basketball player
 Robert L. Barry (born 1934), American diplomat
 Rod Barry, American pornographic actor
 Sam Barry (1892–1959), American sportsman
 Scooter Barry (born 1966), American basketball player; oldest son of Rick Barry
 Sebastian Barry (born 1955), Irish writer
 Spranger Barry (1719–1777), Irish actor
 Stuart Milner-Barry (1906–1995), British codebreaker, civil servant and chess player
 Susan R. Barry, American neurobiologist
 Sy Barry (born 1928), American comic-strip artist
 Tadhg Barry (1880–1921), leading Irish Republican, trade unionist, poet, and GAA official
 Thomas A. Barry (–1947), American college football coach and player, lawyer, and industrial adviser
 Todd Barry (born 1964), American actor and comedian
 Tom Barry (Irish republican) (1897–1980), Irish republican leader
 Tom Barry (screenwriter) (1885–1931), American screenwriter
 Tony Barry (1941–2022), Australian actor 
 Viola Barry (1894–1964), American film actress
 Warren E. Barry, American politician
 Wesley Barry (1907–1994), American child actor
 William Barry (disambiguation)

People with Barry as a given name 
Those for whom Barry is a hypocoristic for another given name are listed separately.

 Barry Alvarez (born 1946), American football coach and sports administrator
 Barry Asher, American bowler
 Barry Atsma, Dutch actor
 Barry Austin (1968–2021), heaviest man in the United Kingdom
 Barry Bannan, Scottish footballer
 Barry K. Barnes, English stage and screen actor
 Barry Beckett, American musician
 Barry Bonds (born 1964), American baseball player
 Barry Bostwick, American actor 
 Barry Chuckle, (born 1944) English comedian and half of the Chuckle Brothers double act
 Barry Cottle (born 1961/62), American businessman, CEO of Scientific Games Corporation 
 Barry Crane, American television producer and bridge player
 Barry Cryer, British comedian
 Barry Davies, BBC sports commentator
 Barry Diller, American businessman
 Barry Evans (disambiguation)
 Barry Fantoni, British writer, painter and jazz musician
 Barry Ferguson, footballer who plays for Scotland and Blackpool FC
 Barry Fitzgerald, Irish and American stage and motion picture actor
 Barry George (born 1960), British criminal
 Barry Gibb (born 1946), English singer and musician, member of the Bee Gees
 Barry Goldwater (1909–1998), American politician
 Barry Hall,  Australian rules footballer
 Barry Hawkins, English snooker player
 Barry Hay, Dutch singer
 Barry Hearn, English sporting events promoter
 Barry L. Houser, American band director and conductor, currently the director of the Marching Illini at the University of Illinois Urbana-Champaign
 Barry Humphries (born 1934), Australian comedian
 Barry Jackson (director), English theatre director and founder of the Birmingham Repertory
 Barry John (born 1945), Welsh rugby union player
 Barry Jones (disambiguation)
 Barry Joule (born 1954/55), Canadian writer
 Barry Kramer, American basketball player and jurist
 Barry Larkin (born 1964), American baseball player
 Barry Latman, American baseball player
 Barry Leibowitz (born 1945), American-Israeli basketball player 
 Barry Levinson, American film director
 Barry Lopez, American author
 Barry Lewis (cook), British YouTuber
 Barry Lewis (cricketer), English cricketer
 Barry MacKay (actor) (1906–1985), British stage and screen actor
 Barry Manilow, American singer
 Barry McConnell, English footballer
 Barry Melrose, Canadian hockey player/coach/commentator
 Barry Moreland (born 1943), Australian dancer and choreographer
 Barry Cennydd Morgan, former Archbishop of Wales
 Barry Nadech, Thai model and actor
 Barry Nelson, American actor
 Barry Newman, American actor
 Barry Norman, British film critic
 Barry O'Farrell, Australian politician
 Barry Otto, Australian actor
 Barry Paul (born 1948), British Olympic fencer
 Barry Pepper, Canadian actor
 Barry Richards (born 1945) South African cricketer
 Barry Richardson (disambiguation)
 Barry Ryan, English singer
 Barry Sanders, American football player
 Barry Sheene, British motorcycle racer
 Barry Silkman (born 1952), English footballer
 Barry Simon, American mathematical physicist
 Barry Sullivan (actor), American actor
 Barry Sullivan (disambiguation), multiple people
 Barry Switzer, American football coach
 Barry Took, British screenwriter
 Barry Van Dyke, American actor
 Barry Waddell (born 1936), Australian cyclist 
 Barry White, American singer
 Barry Williams (disambiguation)
 Barry Wynks (1952–2020), New Zealand lawn bowler

People with Barry as a hypocoristic
 John Finbar Cassin (1924–2017), Irish actor
 Barrington Cunliffe (born 1939), British archaeologist and academic
 Bernard Freundel (born 1951), former rabbi and convicted voyeur
 Barrington Hayles (born 1972), British footballer
 Francis Barrington Hall (1921–2013), Australian diplomat and public servant 
 Bernardus Hulshoff (1946–2020), Dutch footballer
 Finbar Patrick McGuigan (born 1961), Irish boxing promoter and retired boxer
 Barron Rogers (1935–1991), American jazz and salsa trombonist
 Adler Berriman Seal (1939–1986), American airline pilot, drug smuggler and informant
 Bernard Sherman (1942–2017), Canadian billionaire, businessman, philanthropist and murder victim

People with Barry as a nickname
 Jerome "Barry" Morgan (1944–2007), British drummer
 James "Barry" Waldrep (born 1962), American musician, songwriter and composer
 Charles Francis "Barry" Cullen (born 1935), Canadian former National Hockey League player
Barack Obama (born 1961), 44th President of the United States

Fictional characters with the given name 

 Barry "Bear" Baricza, a character from the TV series CHiPs
 Barry Eiesenberg, a main character on the show, Best Friends Whenever
 Barry (American Dad!), a character on the TV series American Dad!
 Barry (Pokémon), a character from the Pokémon video game series.
 Barry and Co., characters in the Conker series
 Barry Allen, The Flash's real name
 Barry Barry, a character from the TV series Waterloo Road
 Barry Bluejeans, character from The Adventure Zone podcast
 Barry Berkman/Barry Block on the TV series Barry
 Barry, Steve Levy's partner in George Shrinks 
 Barry Benson, the protagonist in Bee Movie
 Barry Burton from Resident Evil
 Barry Dejay, the color commentary in Backyard Basketball Barry Evans (EastEnders), a character from the TV series EastEnders Barry Goldberg, a character in the TV sitcom The Goldbergs Barry Kripke, a character on the TV series The Big Bang Theory Redmond Barry of Ballybarry, title character of the novel The Luck of Barry Lyndon and its 1975 film adaptation Barry Lyndon Barry McKenzie, Australian comic strip and movie character
 Barry the Chopper, a character from the manga/anime series Fullmetal Alchemist Barry the Strawberry, a character from the animated film Cloudy with a Chance of Meatballs 2.
 Barry Dylan, a character from the adult animated sitcom Archer Barry Walker, a character in the Netflix series 13 Reasons Why''
 Barry Egan, a character portrayed by Adam Sandler in the Paul Thomas Anderson film Punch-Drunk Love.

See also 
 The Barry Sisters (disambiguation)
 Barry (dog)

Citations

General references 

 
 
 
 
 
 
 
 

English given names
English-language surnames
English masculine given names
English-language masculine given names
Hypocorisms
Lists of people by nickname
Surnames of English origin
Surnames of Irish origin
Given names originating from a surname